In BDSM, edgeplay is a subjective term for activity (sexual or mentally manipulative) that may challenge the conventional safe, sane and consensual ("SSC") scheme; if one is aware of the risks and consequences and is willing to accept them, then the activity is considered risk-aware consensual kink ("RACK").

Edgeplay may involve the consequences of potential short- or long-term harm or death, exemplified by activities such as breathplay (erotic asphyxiation), fire play, knife play, fear play, temperature play, wax play and gunplay, as well as the potential increased risk of disease seroconverting when the risk of bodily fluid exchange is present, such as with cutting, bloodplay, or barebacking.

The mindset of those involved constitutes what is edgeplay because knowledge of or experience with the activity or partner(s) may dictate what and to what extent they will act. The propriety for more dangerous or taboo-themed activities varies by individual, due to differences in moralities as well as trust between participants and experience. The only consistent rule of edgeplay is that activities (including in sadomasochism) must not be coercive, deceitful, or injurious without prior agreement or knowledge. This does exclude how others may react to the outcome(s) of the activity if they go beyond what can be handled by the partners.

In the mid-1990s, the Living in Leather convention did not have discussion on ageplay, salirophilia or scat because, at the time, they were considered too extreme for consensual activity. By 2000, some considered them to be within the scope of edgeplay.

See also
Consent (BDSM)
Erotic electrostimulation
Genital torture (disambiguation)
Limits (BDSM)
Predicament bondage

References

External links 
 Article in Informed Consent BDSM Dictionary
 Education section on various Edgeplay techniques

BDSM terminology